Nasrin Akter Nipun, known by her stage name as Nipun is a Bangladeshi film actress. She won the National Film Awards twice - Best Actress for Shajghor (2007) and Best Supporting Actress for Chander Moto Bou (2009). As of 2014, she has acted in a total of 35 films including Pitar Ason, Rickshawalar Prem, Praner Shami, and Porichoi.

Background 
Akter earned her bachelor's in Computer Science from Moscow State University and she then moved to Los Angeles. She learned Kathak dance in Moscow.

Career
Akter debuted in her acting career in 2006. 

Akter acted in the films of West Bengal including Porichoi (2013) with Prosenjit Chatterjee. 

In 2017, Akter was elected as an active member of Bangladesh Film Development Corporation.

Akter has been declared as the newly elected General Secretary of the BFAA on Saturday Feb 5, 2022 while her competitor Zayed Khan disqualified by its appellate board. But On 2 March 2022, High court declares Zayed Khan as rightfully-elected general secretary of BFFA. On 21 November 2022, The Appellate Division suspended the High Court verdict. As a result of this order, Akter remained as the general secretary of BFAA.

Personal life
Until 2006, Akter lived in Los Angeles with her husband and a daughter, Tanisha.

Works

Films

Television

Web series

Awards and nominations

References

External links 
 

Living people
People from Dhaka
Moscow State University alumni
Bangladeshi film actresses
Bangladeshi television actresses
Best Supporting Actress National Film Award (Bangladesh) winners
Best Supporting Actress Bachsas Award winners
Place of birth missing (living people)
Year of birth missing (living people)